Francesco Lippi (3 December 1211 – 11 December 1291) was an Italian Roman Catholic professed religious from the Carmelites. He lived his life as a soldier before suffering the loss of sight at which point his healing led him down the path of repentance and into the Carmelites.

Lippi was beatified in 1670 after Pope Clement X approved Lippi's longstanding local 'cultus' (or popular devotion).

Life
Francesco Lippi was born on 3 December 1211 in Siena to the nobles Matteo Lippi and Dorotea.

He spent his dissolute adolescence as a soldier that indulged in vices and his outfit captured Sarteano from the Orvientani. But in that conflict he was blinded in 1261. He offered to change his life if he was healed which, according to tradition, occurred after requesting the intercession of Saint James. He travelled on a pilgrimage to Campostella and to the Basilica di San Nicola in Bari to visit the tomb of Saint Nicholas. He also travelled to both Loreto and Rome. Lippi listened to the preaching of Ambrose Sansedoni in Siena and was resolved to live the remainder of his life as a hermit and to do penance for his earlier life; he shut himself in a small cell and remained there from 1261 to 1266.

Lippi entered the Carmelites and continued to live as a hermit. He experienced visions of Jesus Christ and the Madonna as well as seeing angels and experiencing the temptations of demons. He also possessed prophetic gifts.

He died on 11 December 1291. Part of his relics were relocated to a Carmelite convent in Cremona in 1341.

Beatification
The confirmation of the late Lippi's 'cultus' (or popular devotion) allowed for Pope Clement X to approve his beatification in 1670. His iconographical depiction includes a chain and a ball in his mouth which he used to practice silence.

References

External links
Saints SQPN

1211 births
1291 deaths
13th-century venerated Christians
13th-century Italian Christian monks
Beatifications by Pope Clement X
Carmelite beatified people
Italian beatified people
People from Siena
Venerated Carmelites